Preslav Ivelinov Petrov (born 1 May 1995) is a Bulgarian footballer who plays as a defender.

Career

Youth career
Petrov started his career in Litex Lovech. He later joined Vidima-Rakovski's academy and eventually made a professional debut for the team in 2012. On 6 June 2014, Petrov joined Ludogorets Razgrad.

Together with Steven Petkov, he was witness about the 2014 U19 team match fixing scandal.

Ludogorets Razgrad
Petrov made his professional debut for the team on 9 August 2014 in a match against PFC Lokomotiv Plovdiv. During the 2015–16 season after the creation of the 2nd teams, Petrov became a regular for Ludogorets Razgrad II in the B Group.

Dunav Ruse
On 6 June 2017 he signed a contract with Dunav Ruse.

Grafičar
In the season 2020–21, after a short spell with FC Montana, he signed with Serbian second-tier side FK Grafičar Beograd.

Club statistics

Club

Honours
Ludogorets
First Professional League: 2014–15, 2015–16
Bulgarian Cup runners-up: 2017
Bulgarian Supercup winner: 2014
Bulgarian Supercup runners-up: 2015

Notes

References

External links
Player Profile at UEFA.com

1995 births
Living people
Bulgarian footballers
Bulgaria youth international footballers
First Professional Football League (Bulgaria) players
Second Professional Football League (Bulgaria) players
PFC Vidima-Rakovski Sevlievo players
PFC Ludogorets Razgrad II players
PFC Ludogorets Razgrad players
FC Dunav Ruse players
PFC Slavia Sofia players
FC Montana players
Association football defenders
People from Troyan
RFK Grafičar Beograd players
Serbian First League players
Bulgarian expatriate footballers
Expatriate footballers in Serbia
Bulgarian expatriate sportspeople in Serbia